Hôtel Le Concorde Québec is a skyscraper hotel in Quebec City, Quebec, Canada. It contains 405 rooms over 26 floors. Le Concorde is known for its revolving restaurant, Ciel! (formerly L'Astral), which is situated on the top floor of the hotel and offers a 360-degree view of Quebec City and the Saint Lawrence River. The hotel is located in the historic restaurant district La Grande Allée and behind is the historic national park The Plains of Abraham (French: Les plaines d'Abraham) and The Battlefields Park (French: Parc des Champs-de-Bataille).

History
From its construction in 1970 by wealthy businessman Marcel Adams, owner of the company Développement Iberville, Le Concorde was operated by the luxury hotel management company Loews under the terms of a 99-year lease. In 2069, at the end of this lease, ownership was to return to Adams or his successor.

In November 2013, Loews announced that the building would cease operations as a hotel in February 2014. Early in January, it was announced that the hotel would be sold to Groupe Savoie for $11,5M in order to transform it into a luxury retirement apartment building. This plan was met with a great deal of opposition from local businesses, who feared the loss of customers from the hotel. In the end, the hotel closed for a time. But it was repurchased for $13M by the businessman Jean-Guy Sylvain, who already owned other hotels in the Old Capital region, and his associates who renovated the building. The hotel reopened in May 2014 as an independent hotel under the brand Hôtel Le Concorde Québec, no longer affiliated with the Loews chain. Since October 2015, as a landmark building, its exterior is illuminated at night.

See also
List of tallest buildings in Quebec City

References

External links
Official website

Hotels in Quebec City
Brutalist architecture in Canada
Hotel buildings completed in 1974
Skyscraper hotels in Canada
Hotels established in 1974
1974 establishments in Quebec